The 2017 season is Ceres–Negros' 1st season in the Philippines Football League (PFL), the top flight of Philippines football. They finished second in the PFL regular season though they became the league's first champions after they won over Global Cebu in the Final Series.

They also participated in the 2017 AFC Cup where they become the ASEAN zonal champions though they were eliminated by Tajik club Istiklol in the inter-zone Play-off semifinal.

Competitions

Overview

Philippines Football League

Regular season

Note:
 a Because of the ongoing works in the Marikina Sports Complex, the team will play its first few league games at the Biñan Football Stadium and Rizal Memorial Stadium and will have to groundshare with Stallion Laguna and Meralco Manila, respectively.
 b The home stadium of the club is located in Bantay, Ilocos Sur, a nearby town of Vigan. For administrative and marketing purposes, the home city of Ilocos United is designated as "Vigan"
 c Because of the unavailability of the Davao del Norte Sports Complex, the match was played instead in Rizal Memorial Stadium, Manila.

Final Series

Ceres–Negros won 3–1 on aggregate.

AFC Cup

Group stage

Knockout stage

ASEAN Zonal Semifinal

4–4 on aggregate. Ceres–Negros won 2–1 on away goals.

ASEAN Zonal Final

Ceres–Negros won 3–2 on aggregate.

Inter-zone Play-off Semifinal

Istikol won 5–1 on aggregate.

Singapore Cup

Statistics

Goalscorers

League squad

Transfers

Preseason

In

Out

Mid-season

In

Out

References

Ceres–Negros F.C. seasons
Ceres-Negros 2017
Ceres-Negros 2017